Route 2A is a state highway in the U.S. state of Connecticut. It is a  mostly expressway alternate route of Route 2 that bypasses the downtown area of the city of Norwich and serves as the main access road to the Mohegan Sun casino.

Route description
Route 2A begins at the junction of I-395 and Route 2/Route 32 in Norwich. Route 2A travels south along I-395 for  before separating as its own 2-lane freeway at I-395 Exit 9 in Montville. After turning north onto Route 12 for a brief overlap, it resumes its easterly course, meeting with Route 117 in the village of Poquetanuck. From here, Routes 2A and 117 continue north as a concurrency to Route 2 where both routes end.

History
When the highway and bridge opened in December 1967, motorists were charged a 15-cent toll.  The toll plaza located at the west end of the Mohegan-Pequot Bridge was removed in 1980.

Major intersections
The Connecticut Department of Transportation announced in May 2013 that exit numbers on I-395 and Route 2A would be renumbered from the then-existing sequential-based system to mileage-based numbering; the numbers on I-395 were changed from June to November 2015, the Route 2A numbers by March 2016. The old exit numbers were posted above the new exit tab for the mile-based numbers until 2017.

References

External links

002A
Transportation in New London County, Connecticut
Montville, Connecticut
New London, Connecticut
Preston, Connecticut
Buildings and structures in New London County, Connecticut
Freeways in the United States